Up, Down, Fragile is a 1995 French film directed by Jacques Rivette. It was entered into the 19th Moscow International Film Festival. Interspersed with songs and dances, the film recounts the adventures of three young women in Paris, each at a turning point in her life.

Plot
Three young women with very different values are in Paris on their own. The shy Ida, highly conscious that she is an adopted child, is starting her first job as a university librarian. The fragile Louise, daughter of a rich but crooked Swiss banker, is trying to find herself after years in a coma. The streetwise Ninon, a liar and a thief, has left her homicidal pimp to become a courier. As their stories unfold, their paths cross and the girls get involved with various people. Roland owns a set decorating business, Sarah is a night-club singer, and Lucien is a conscientious young private detective. Louise finds love with Lucien, who had been hired by her father to shadow her, and Roland may link up with Ninon. Ida is not yet ready for a man, because her first need is to find her birth mother, who may be Sarah.

Cast

References

External links 
 

1990s musical comedy films
1995 films
Films directed by Jacques Rivette
1990s French-language films
French musical comedy films
1995 comedy films
1990s French films